Vanitha Police is a 1984 Indian Malayalam-language film directed by Alleppey Ashraf and written by Priyadarshan. The film stars Prem Nazir, Seema, Sukumari and Mohanlal in main roles. The film features songs composed by Gopan and background score by Guna Singh.

Plot

Cast

Prem Nazir as Pilla
Seema as Sasikala
Sukumari as Idiyan Sarasamma
Mohanlal as Achuthan
Jagathy Sreekumar as Sivan Pilla
Kollam Gopi
 Ramu
Sankaradi as Chelleppan Pilla
Alleppey Ashraf as Director Keshavan
Aroor Sathyan
Mala Aravindan
Master Suresh as Vichu
Meena
Poojappura Ravi as Vasu Pilla
Santhakumari
Sathyachithra
Sathyakala
Soorya as Kousalya
Vanitha Krishnachandran as Rathnamma
Nalinikanth
Thavakkala as Undapakru
Rajan Paul
Shankar as himself (Cameo appearance)

Soundtrack
The music was composed by Gopan and the lyrics were written by Madhu Alappuzha.

Release

References

External links
 

1984 films
1980s Malayalam-language films
Films directed by Alleppey Ashraf